Rhopalomastix escherichi is a species of ant of the subfamily Myrmicinae that can be found in Sri Lanka.

References

External links
 at antwiki.org
Animaldiversity.org
Itis.org

Myrmicinae
Hymenoptera of Asia
Insects described in 1911